Tierra Caliente (Spanish for Hot Land) is a cultural and geographical region in southern Mexico that comprises some low-elevation areas of the states of Michoacán, Guerrero and Mexico. As the name suggests, the region is characterized by a hot climate. The overall precipitation is also low - around 600 mm/year, but can be as low as 400 mm in some low-lying areas of Michoacán and Guerrero.

Municipalities

Guerrero

State of Mexico 

Michoacán:
 Tepalcatepec
 Churumuco de Morelos
 San Lucas
 Lombardia
 Nueva Italia
 Aguililla
 Tingambato
 Tuzantla
 Susupuato de Guerrero
 Nocupétaro
 Carácuaro
 Tiquicheo
 Huetamo de Nuñez

Sources

References
 Entregan recursos de Codecos a las regiones Oriente y Tierra Caliente. State of Michoacán.
 Acuña, R. (1987). Relaciones Geográficas del Siglo XVI: Michoacán. Universidad Nacional Autónoma de México.
 Gerhard, P. (1972). A Guide to the Historical Geography of New Spain. University of Cambridge Press.
 Sebastian Avellaneda Jr. (2013). Information over San Lucas, Michoacán. Ohio Valley University, WV.

Regions of Mexico
Geography of Guerrero
Geography of Michoacán
Geography of the State of Mexico